WKVI-FM (99.3 MHz) and WKVI (1520 kHz) are radio stations licensed to Knox, Indiana and are owned by 
Kankakee Valley Broadcasting Company, Incorporated.

Vinyl Gold 99.3 WKVI-FM plays an oldies format featuring hourly local news, AG news, Fox News, Accuweather, and High School sports covering 7 schools

All News AM 1520 WKVI plays local news, ABC News, AP News, state news from Network Indiana and Accuweather.  The station(s) serve the Kankakee Valley area of North Central Indiana on the southern fringe of the South Bend market.  The company also operates an active website and Facebook page.

During 2014, KVB Co., Inc. built a Class A FM station, with a full-time power of 6,000 watts, licensed to Culver, IN under a Construction Permit (CP) issued by the FCC.  The station is known as MAX 98.3 FM WYMR and is currently on-the-air.

History
WKVI first went live on July 21, 1969. Harold Welter, previously working at a radio station in Laporte, IN, was manager and reported the on-air news. Ted Hayes, hired by Mr. Welter in June of '69, played the music.

The original WKVI team also included:
 Bob Densmore- Engineer,
 Becky Keys- Secretary,
 Harvey Allen- Disc Jockey,
 Bill Harvey- Disc Jockey,
 Joe Steiner- News Director.

In early November 2014, WKVI-FM received the Spectrum Award as Station of the Year (Market 3) from the Indiana Broadcasters Association.

On September 5, 2022, WKVI-FM changed its format to oldies as "Vinyl Gold", focusing on music released between 1964 and 1975 flanking sister classic hits station WYMR, which plays music in the 1970s and the 1980s.

Current staff
 General manager/Mid-days - Lenny Dessauer
 News Director/News Anchor - Anita Goodan
 WKVI Morning Show -Rich Wallen
 Afternoons - Lenny Dessauer
 Sports director - Mitch Columbe
 Office Manager - Chris Milner
 General Sales Manager/Consultant - Rich Wallen
 Marketing director/Trip Coordinator - Lenny Dessauer

References

External links
WKVI website

KVI
Starke County, Indiana
Radio stations established in 1969
1969 establishments in Indiana
KVI